The 1995 Baltimore Stallions season was the second and final season in the history of the Baltimore CFL franchise. The team became the first (and to date, only) American-based football team to win the Grey Cup. Despite the Stallions success, attendance dropped. The club only sold 9,000 season tickets.

As it turned out, the 83rd Grey Cup would be the last game the Stallions would ever play.  A week before the Grey Cup, the Cleveland Browns announced they were moving to Baltimore.  Owner Jim Speros balked at the prospect of competing with an NFL team and opted to move elsewhere.  When it became apparent that the CFL was giving up its attempt to gain a foothold in the United States, he opted to move his team to Montreal as the Montreal Alouettes.  In doing so, Speros canceled his franchise in Baltimore and revived the 1946–86 Alouettes franchise.  As a result, the 1995 season is officially the last season of Stallions history, and the Stallions are officially one of only two Grey Cup champions in the modern era to fold.

Preseason

Regular season
After the 1994 season, a name-the-team fan poll was held to decide a new team name.  After the team's first week of the season being known as the Baltimore Football Club, the fan poll ended and Jim Speros announced to the Baltimore faithful that their team would be known as the Baltimore Stallions.
Mike Pringle's rushing totals were 1,791 yards. Compared to his stats in the 1994 season, his yards-per-carry fell by .6 from 6.4 to 5.8. Despite the reduction, his statistics were still the best any back posted in the CFL that year.

Season standings

Season schedule

Playoffs
Mike Pringle ran for 484 playoff yards and four touchdowns in three games. The result was that the Baltimore Stallions made their second straight appearance in the Grey Cup.

Grey Cup
The 83rd Grey Cup was played between the Baltimore Stallions and the Calgary Stampeders at Taylor Field in Regina, Saskatchewan. The Stallions won the game by a score of 37–20.  It marked the only time that an American-based team won the Grey Cup. Not one television station from Baltimore sent a crew to Regina to cover the Grey Cup game. Only 200 fans showed up for the Stallions Grey Cup celebration. As for the Grey Cup game itself, Chris Wright scored a then CFL record 82 yard punt return touchdown. The aforementioned record stood until the 2018 Grey Cup, with Terry Williams returning a punt for 97 yards to conclude the first half.

Awards and honors
After the season, other Baltimore Stallions' received awards and accomplishments in the CFL, which are:

Divisional Awards
 Most Valuable Player of the East Division – Mike Pringle (RB)
 Most Outstanding Rookie of the East Division – Chris Wright (WR)
 Most Outstanding Offensive Lineman Award of the East Division – Mike Withycombe (OG)

CFL Awards
 CFL's Most Outstanding Player Award – Mike Pringle (RB)
 CFL's Most Outstanding Offensive Lineman Award – Mike Withycombe (OG) 
 CFL's Coach of the Year – Don Matthews
 Grey Cup's Most Valuable Player – Tracy Ham (QB)

1995 Southern All-Stars

Offense
 Mike Pringle (RB)
 Chris Armstrong (SB)
 Mike Withycombe (OG)
 Shar Pourdanesh (OT)
 Neal Fort (OT)

Defense
 Jerald Baylis (DT)
 Elfrid Payton (DE)
 Tracy Gravely (LB)
 O. J. Brigance (LB)
 Irvin Smith (CB)
 Charles Anthony (DB)

Special Teams
 Josh Miller (P)
 Chris Wright (ST)

1995 CFL All-Stars

Offense
 Mike Pringle (RB)
 Mike Withycombe (OG)
 Neal Fort (OT)

Defense
 Jerald Baylis (DT)
 O. J. Brigance (LB)
 Irvin Smith (CB)
 Charles Anthony (DB)

Special Teams
 Josh Miller (P)
 Chris Wright (ST)

Relocation to Montreal
In late 1995, Cleveland Browns owner Art Modell announced his intention to relocate his NFL club to Baltimore, where they would be rechristened the Baltimore Ravens. This would have made the Stallions the only CFL club ever to directly compete with the NFL, whose season overlaps with the last three months of the CFL season.

In late November, Jim Speros had a Save our Stallions campaign, with January 5 as the deadline to sell 20,000 season tickets. It was revealed that the team was $800,000 in debt.

Stallions owner Jim Speros realized that despite the Stallions' popularity, they could not possibly compete with the NFL. After deals with Norfolk, Virginia and Houston fell through, Speros moved the Stallions to Montreal and revived the old Alouettes name for the 1996 season.

References

Baltimore Stallions Season, 1995
Baltimore Stallions
James S. Dixon Trophy championship seasons
Grey Cup championship seasons
Baltimore Stallions